Khatron Ke Khiladi is a 1988 Indian Bollywood action film directed by T. Rama Rao and produced by V. B. Rajendra Prasad. It stars Dharmendra, Sanjay Dutt, Chunky Pandey, Madhuri Dixit and Neelam in pivotal roles. The film was remade in Telugu as Simha Swapnam.

Cast

Plot
Honest truck driver Balwant watch helplessly as the owners of the trucking company he works for mauled his brother, Jaswant to death. When he lodges a complaint with the police the inspector instead arrest him for this crime; the trucking company owners then burn his house killing his pregnant wife Sumati. Years later Balwant who now calls himself Karamvir operates a court called 'Teesri Adalat' by sentencing wrong-doers to death in a judge and executor style. However he is unaware that Sumati is still alive and has given birth to twins Rajesh and Mahesh; while Mahesh was separated at birth and grows up with Inspector Ram Avtar and his wife - Rajesh is taking care of his mother as she loses her mental balance in the trauma. Rajesh and Mahesh do get to unite as the girls Kavita and Sunita  whom they are in love with are a link to each other. After a few misjudgments of situations at hand Rajesh and Mahesh decides that they will bring Teesri Adalat to the court of law - at any cost.

Soundtrack
Lyrics: Anand Bakshi

References

External links

1980s Hindi-language films
1988 films
Films directed by T. Rama Rao
Films scored by Laxmikant–Pyarelal
Hindi films remade in other languages